Strawberry Lake may refer to:
 Strawberry Lake (Michigan)
 Strawberry Lake (Oregon)
 Strawberry Lake (Colorado), a lake where the Rainbow Family held their first gathering
 "Strawberry Lake", a song by the Original 7ven from Condensate

See also
 Strawberry Reservoir, a reservoir in Utah